Transactions of the Royal Society of Tropical Medicine and Hygiene is a monthly peer-reviewed medical journal covering all aspects of tropical medicine. It is the official journal of the Royal Society of Tropical Medicine and Hygiene and is published by Oxford University Press. According to the Journal Citation Reports, the journal has a 2018 impact factor of 2.820.

The journal published the first report on Zika virus in 1952.

References

External links 
 

Oxford University Press academic journals
Monthly journals
English-language journals
Publications established in 1908
Tropical medicine and hygiene journals
Academic journals associated with learned and professional societies of the United Kingdom
Royal Society of Tropical Medicine and Hygiene